BBC Points West (known as News West from June 1991 until May 2000) is the BBC's regional TV news programme for the West of England, covering Bristol, the majority of Wiltshire and Gloucestershire, northern, eastern and parts of western and southern Somerset & North Dorset.

History
Regional television news in the West of England began in September 1957 with daily short bulletins. Around this time, news bulletins for the West shared a 5–10 minute timeslot with Welsh news bulletins as the Wenvoe transmitter on the western outskirts of Cardiff was serving viewers in both south Wales and the West of England. The West's regional bulletins were relaunched in 1962 as Points West but still shared the new 25-minute timeslot with Wales Today.

The launch of a dedicated BBC Wales television station in February 1964 allowed Points West to become a full-length regional news programme broadcast only to the West of England. Between 1991 and 2000, the programme was known as BBC News West.

Notable presenters and reporters
David Garmston
Alex Lovell
Ian Fergusson
Fiona Lamdin
Dan Johnson (network correspondent for BBC News)

Former presenters and reporters
Chris Vacher
Susan Osman
Gerald Hine-Haycock (as Gerald Haycock)
Michael Buerk
Armine Sandford
Vivien Creegor 
Sue Carpenter
Clive Myrie
Saima Mohsin
Richard Angwin (weather)

See also
BBC News

References

External links

BBC Regional News shows
1950s British television series
1960s British television series
1970s British television series
1980s British television series
1990s British television series
2000s British television series
2010s British television series
2020s British television series
1957 British television series debuts
English-language television shows
Television news in England